The Hawkesbury Gold Cup is a Hawkesbury Racing Club Group 3  Thoroughbred open handicap horse race over a distance of 1600 metres, held at Hawkesbury Racecourse in Clarendon, New South Wales, Australia.  Total prize money for the race is A$200,000.

History
Originally this race was held in December and was moved to November in 2008.  The race was once again moved in 2013 to August and in 2014 to May.

Distance
 1980–1988 – 2000 metres
 1989 onwards - 1600 metres
 2020 - 1500 metres

Grade
 1980–1997 - Listed Race
 1997 onwards - Group 3

Venue
 2020 - Rosehill Racecourse

Winners

 2022 - Kirwan's Lane  
 2021 - Archedemus  
 2020 - Amangiri  
 2019 - Archedemus  
 2018 - Kingsguard  
 2017 - Fabrizio  
 2016 - Amovatio  
 2015 - Sons of John
 2014 - Leebaz
 2013 - Coup Ay Tee
 2012 - Darci Be Good
 2011 - Somepin Anypin
 2010 - Thankgodyou'rehere
 2009 - Keepin' The Dream
 2008 - Nuclear Sky
 2007 - race not held
 2006 - Beauty Watch
 2005 - Wild Queen
 2004 - Court's In Session
 2003 - Stoway
 2002 - This Manshood
 2001 - Carael Boy
 2000 - Huge Demand
 1999 - Huge Demand
 1998 - Referral
 1997 - Quick Flick
 1996 - Magic Road
 1995 - Magic Road
 1994 - Jack Attack
 1993 - Thrifty Reserve
 1992 - Mr Impose
 1991 - Shining Wind
 1990 - Rancho Classic
 1989 - Swain
 1988 - Regal Native
 1987 - My Parade
 1986 - Gold Zama
 1985 - Peaceful Joe
 1984 - Kutzbah
 1983 - Almond Valley
 1982 - Knight's Affair
 1981 - King's Ideal
 1980 - Peninsula

 Race meeting scheduled for 2 May 2015 was abandoned after the first race on the card due to prolonged rain that affected the condition of the track. The event was rescheduled for later and held on 7 June 2015.
 Not held because of outbreak of equine influenza

See also
 List of Australian Group races
 Group races

References

Horse races in Australia